The 2016 Lega Basket Serie A Finals was the championship series of the 2015–16 regular season, of the Lega Basket Serie A, the highest professional basketball league in Italy, and the conclusion of the season's playoffs. The 2015–16 regular season champion EA7 Emporio Armani Milano possessing home advantage (with the first two, the fifth and the seventh games at the Mediolanum Forum) and the second placed Grissin Bon Reggio Emilia contested for the title in a best-of-7 showdown, from June 3 to 15, 2016. 
These were the second Finals for Grissin Bon Reggio Emilia.

EA7 Emporio Armani Milano won their 27th title bt beating Grissin Bon Reggio Emilia in game 6 of the Finals.

Rakim Sanders of the EA7 Emporio Armani Milano was named MVP in the league's Finals series of the playoffs.

Road to the finals

Regular season series

Series

Game 1

Game 2

Game 3

Game 4

Game 5

Game 6

Rosters

EA7 Emporio Armani Milano

Grissin Bon Reggio Emilia

References

External links
Official website

Finals
Lega Basket Serie A Finals